An Acte agaynst counterfeting of forrayne Coyne (4 Hen. 7 c. 18) was an Act of the Parliament of England passed in 1488. It made it high treason to counterfeit coinage from other countries. (It was already treason to counterfeit English coins, under the Treason Act 1351.) It was repealed by the Treason Act 1553, but another Act passed later in the same year recreated the offence.

See also
High treason in the United Kingdom

References

Treason in England
Acts of the Parliament of England (1485–1603)
1480s in law
1488 in England